Andrés Carlos Caro Serrano (born 1 February 2004) is a Spanish footballer who plays as a central defender for Málaga CF.

Club career
Born in Rincón de la Victoria, Málaga, Andalusia, Caro joined Málaga CF's youth setup in 2011, from hometown side CD Rincón. He made his senior debut with the reserves on 9 May 2021, coming on as a second-half substitute in a 3–0 Tercera División home win against CD Huétor Vega.

Caro made his first team debut at the age of just 17 on 30 May 2021, replacing fellow youth graduate Juande late into a 3–0 home win against CD Castellón in the Segunda División championship.

References

External links
Málaga profile 

2004 births
Living people
Sportspeople from the Province of Málaga
Spanish footballers
Footballers from Andalusia
Association football defenders
Segunda División players
Tercera División players
Atlético Malagueño players
Málaga CF players
Spain youth international footballers